Dungeons & Dragons Immortals Rules, written by Frank Mentzer, is a boxed set for the Dungeons & Dragons (D&D) fantasy role-playing game first published by TSR in 1986 as an expansion to the Basic Set.

Publication history
The Dungeons & Dragons Basic Set was revised in 1983 by Frank Mentzer as Dungeons & Dragons Set 1: Basic Rules.  Between 1983 and 1985, the system was revised and expanded by Mentzer as a series of five boxed sets, including: the Basic Rules (supporting character levels 1–3), Expert Rules (supporting levels 4–14), Companion Rules (supporting levels 15–25), Master Rules (supporting levels 26–36), and Immortals Rules (supporting Immortals—characters who had transcended levels).

The Immortals Rules set contains two booklets: one is fifty-two pages long and the other is thirty-two pages. The booklets, Player's Guide to Immortals and DM's Guide to Immortals, were written by Frank Mentzer and edited by Anne Gray McCready, with cover artwork by Larry Elmore, and interior illustrations by Elmore and Jeff Easley. Harold Johnson also had a role in editing and development.

Contents
Immortals Rules deals with player characters that have successfully followed the courses laid out in the Master Rules for attaining immortality. This set adds a system of power points; upon achieving immortality, characters exchange all of their experience points for power points at a rate of ten thousand to one. Power points can be expended to permanently enhance attribute scores, and form a magic point system to fuel a character's new range of special abilities. Immortals advance in ranks instead of levels; a character must keep a certain balance of power points to maintain a rank, and must compete in the Olympics to gain promotion to the next rank. The combat and magic systems are also expanded to take into account the new Immortal powers. Each Immortal player character has an abundance of powers, literally able to cast any magic spell in addition to new combat abilities. The rules cover transhuman Immortal characters, their powers, artifacts, and relationships with other Immortals, and their ability to create personal "home planes". The set also includes new powerful monsters, and suggestions for adventure scenarios.

The set describes the history of Immortals within the D&D game: once there were only three Immortals, who discovered the multiverse, and decided to give it order and purpose. This set expands the D&D multiverse system, with an Astral Plane that permeates and connects the whole of the multiverse. In addition to the Astral Plane, there are also the Prime Material Plane, elemental planes, the Ethereal Planes, and many outer planes; these outer planes range from mono-spatial atto-planes (about 1/3" big) to penta-spatial tera-planes (about 851 billion light-years big). The set provides notes for the Dungeon Master (DM) concerning running Immortal campaigns, which cover the goals of Immortals and their place within Immortal society, including duties and responsibilities. The DM plays the roles of the Immortals' superiors, the Hierarchs of each sphere. There are also sample plots for Immortal adventures, and twenty-two pages discussing monsters; this includes a range of demons which originally appeared in Eldritch Wizardry.

Reception
The Immortals Rules was reviewed by Graeme Davis in issue No. 83 of White Dwarf magazine, who referred to this set as "the culmination of the D&D game system". Davis found the set interesting, although he could not imagine actually playing it.

Lawrence Schick, in his 1991 book Heroic Worlds, felt that "Play using the Immortals rules is so different from low-level D&D as to be almost another game entirely."

Reviews
 Casus Belli #36 (Feb 1987)

References

Dungeons & Dragons sourcebooks
Role-playing game supplements introduced in 1986